The First Battle of Guilin took place on May 15, 1929, in the northern part of Guangxi, China. It was one of the civil war battles that took place inside the National Revolutionary Army. The warring parties in Guilin battle, one side is the Fourth Army of the Xiang Army, and the other is the Army of the New Guangxi Clique. On the same day, the New Guangxi clique attacked the Guangdong Army at Huizhou in eastern Guangdong.

References
"Main Campaign Table of Chinese Modern Military History" edited by the National Defense University of the Republic of China

Conflicts in 1929
1929 in China